CJKC-FM is a Canadian radio station, broadcasting at 103.1 FM in Kamloops, British Columbia. The station broadcasts a country format branded as New Country 103.1.

The station received approval in 2005  and was launched on August 11, 2006 by local broadcaster NL Broadcasting, the owner of CHNL and CKRV. It was acquired by Newcap Radio in 2017.

References

External links
New Country 103.1
 

JKC
JKC
Radio stations established in 2006
2006 establishments in British Columbia
JKC